Feury is a surname. Notable people with the name include:

Otto Freiherr von Feury (1906–1998), German politician
Peggy Feury (1924–1985), American stage and film actress

See also
Mount Feury, is a mountain between Sikorski Glacier and Frankenfield Glacier on the northeast side of Noville Peninsula, Thurston Island